Great Plains Examiner was a periodical newspaper based in Bismarck, North Dakota, active between June 2011 and September 2013. The newspaper was dedicated to investigative and in-depth coverage of local issues affecting central North Dakota, with emphasis on the communities of Bismarck and Mandan. The newspaper was published monthly and distributed on news racks and via direct mail. Each month, 10,000 copies of the paper were placed on racks at gas stations, restaurants, hotels and other high-traffic commercial areas. The newspaper was free, although home delivery was $25 per year.

The Great Plains Examiner launched in June 2011. It is a subsidiary of Highground Publishing Inc., a corporation owned and operated by North Dakota natives. More than a dozen journalists contributed to the paper. The last issue published was September 2013.

References

External links
 Official website

2011 establishments in North Dakota
Bismarck–Mandan
Monthly newspapers
Newspapers published in North Dakota
Publications established in 2011
2013 disestablishments in North Dakota
Defunct newspapers published in North Dakota
Publications disestablished in 2013